Haiti participated at the 2018 Summer Youth Olympics in Buenos Aires, Argentina from 6 October to 18 October 2018.

Athletics

Equestrian

Haiti was given a rider to compete from the tripartite committee.

 Individual Jumping - 1 athlete

References

2018 in Haitian sport
Nations at the 2018 Summer Youth Olympics
Haiti at the Youth Olympics